Prabhakaran Gopalakrishnan (born 20 August 1988) is an Indian cricketer. He made his List A debut for Puducherry in the 2018–19 Vijay Hazare Trophy on 21 September 2018.

References

External links
 

1988 births
Living people
Indian cricketers
Pondicherry cricketers
Place of birth missing (living people)